The France national under-20 football team represents France in men's international football at this age level and is controlled by the French Football Federation. Since there is no under-20 UEFA tournament, the team competes for the FIFA U-20 World Cup. The under-20 team also participates in the Toulon Tournament, usually replacing the under-21 team, and in the football tournaments of the Mediterranean Games and the Jeux de la Francophonie.

France were the world champions, winning the 2013 FIFA U-20 World Cup. The team reached the semifinals for the first time in their history in 2011, and they have also made it to the quarterfinals in two occasions, in 1997 and 2001.

Competitive Record

FIFA World Youth Championship/U-20 World Cup Record

Players

Current squad 
 The following players were called up for the friendly matches.
 Match dates: 17, 19 and 21 November 2022
 Opposition: ,  and 
 Caps and goals correct as of: 7 October 2022, after the match against 

Recent callups
The following players have also been called up to the France under-20 squad and remain eligible:

Notes
INJ Player withdrew from the squad due to an injury.

 Previous squads 

FIFA U-20 World Cup/Youth Championship squads
2013 FIFA U-20 World Cup – France
2011 FIFA U-20 World Cup – France
2001 FIFA World Youth Championship squads – France
1997 FIFA World Youth Championship squads – France
1977 FIFA World Youth Championship squads – France

HonoursFIFA U-20 World CupChampions: 2013

 Toulon Tournament'Champions (13): 1977, 1984, 1985, 1987, 1988, 1989, 1997, 2004, 2005, 2006, 2007, 2015, 2022Finalists (14):'' 1975, 1976, 1978, 1980, 1986, 1991, 1993, 1995, 1996, 1998, 2009, 2011, 2014, 2016

References

External links
 Official site

Under-20
European national under-20 association football teams
Youth football in France